Samsung Galaxy S Duos 3 is a dual SIM Android smartphone, produced and marketed by Samsung Electronics, which serves as an immediate successor to the original Galaxy S Duos 2 of 2013. It was announced in August 2014 and was made available on the same month.

In contrast with other dual SIM Samsung models, this phone is a part of the high-end "S" series, this is why it is marketed as a part of the "Galaxy S" family. Despite being called as a direct successor to the original S Duos 2 phone, external and physical design of the model is identical to the original model, except for the menu button which is now replaced by the recent apps button and also placing emphasis on internal upgrades such as upgraded processor and an updated Android operating system. It remains available in many Asian countries.

Specifications

Design 
The design of the S Duos 3 is the same as the design of the S Duos and the S Duos 2. It has a bit less rounded shape with chrome finish edges, the same polycarbonate chassis, faux metal trim and a removable rear cover, with a premium texture finish. The S Duos 3 is available in Black, and White frost color finishes.

Hardware
The S Duos 3 has a 1.0 GHz dual-core processor alongside the 512 MB RAM and 4 GB internal storage (only 2.1 GB is user accessible). It has a 5 megapixel rear camera assisted with LED flash and a 0.3 megapixel (VGA) front-facing camera. The rear camera has 7 shooting modes and can record video in 720p.

The S Duos 3 has a 4.0-inch (100.8 mm) WVGA TFT LCD display with 480x800 pixels resolution and 233 ppi pixel density, which is the same as that of the S Duos 2, but does not allow for automatic brightness and gamut adjustments due to lacking an ambient sensor unlike its predecessor. It lacks a proximity sensor.

The S Duos 3 also contains a 1500 mAh Li-Ion removable battery. It lasts 4–5 hours of heavy usage and just over 3 hours of gaming.

Unlike entry-level dual SIM models from Samsung, the S Duos 3 is active on both SIMs all the time similar to the S Duos 2; so it is ready to receive calls on either SIM when a call is not already in progress. Optionally, it can receive two calls simultaneously, but this requires divert-on-not-reachable to be set up on each number and is subject to availability from the carrier and may incur additional charges. A limitation of the phone is that only one SIM can be active on UMTS (and therefore data) at a time and so it may be unsuitable for certain combinations of networks.

Software
The S Duos 3 ships with Android 4.4.2 KitKat and Samsung's updated TouchWiz Essence UX user interface. The S Duos 3 adds some of the features of the Galaxy S4 such as Samsung proprietary widgets used by models bearing the same version of the OS. Custom ROMs such as AOSP 5.1 and CyanogenMod 12.1 by itigr, are available for updating to Android 5.1.1 Lollipop.

See also 
 Comparison of Samsung Galaxy S smartphones
 Comparison of smartphones
 Samsung Galaxy S series

References 

Android (operating system) devices
Samsung mobile phones
Samsung Galaxy
Mobile phones introduced in 2014
Mobile phones with user-replaceable battery